Social equity is concerned with justice and fairness of social policy. Since the 1960s, the concept of social equity has been used in a variety of institutional contexts, including education and public administration.

Overview
Definitions of social equity can vary but all focus on the ideals of justice and fairness. Equity in old societies involves the role of public administrators, who are responsible for ensuring that social services are delivered equitably. This implies taking into account historical and current inequalities among groups. Fairness is dependent on this social and historical context.

In public administration

Attention to social equity in the field of public administration in the United States arose during the 1960s, amid growing national awareness of civil rights and racial inequality.

The National Academy of Public Administration defines the term as “The fair, just and equitable management of all institutions serving the public directly or by contract; the fair, just and equitable distribution of public services and implementation of public policy; and the commitment to promote fairness, justice, and equity in the formation of public policy.”

In 1968, H. George Frederickson articulated "a theory of social equity" and put it forward as the 'third pillar' of public administration. Frederickson was concerned that those in public administration were making the mistake of assuming that citizen A is the same as citizen B; ignoring social and economic conditions. His goal: for social equity to take on the same "status as economy and efficiency as values or principles to which public administration should adhere."

Sex, gender and sexuality

Recent administration from former U.S. President Barack Obama has shed light on the subject of social equity for members of the LGBT community. The Obama administration appointed more than 170 openly LGBT professionals to work full-time within the executive branch and directed United States Department of Housing and Urban Development to conduct “the first ever national study to determine the level of discrimination experienced by LGBTs in housing” Other LGBT advocacy interest groups, such as the Human Rights Campaign, have also worked hard to gain social equity in marriage and to receive all the benefits that come with marriage.
Other references include:
Mitchell, Danielle. "Reading Between The Aisles: Same-Sex Marriage As A Conflicted Symbol Of Social Equity." Topic: The Washington & Jefferson College Review 55.(2007): 89–100. Humanities Source. Web.

Race

Within the realm of public administration, racial equality is an important factor. It deals with the idea of “biological equality” of all human races and “social equality for people of different races”. According to Jeffrey B. Ferguson his article “Freedom, Equality, Race”, the people of the United States believe that racial equality will prevail.

Religion

Social equity in regards to religion has legal protections in some jurisdictions. In the US, individuals, regardless of religious affiliation or practice are afforded . According to 42 U.S.C. sect. 2000e(j) "Religion is defined as all aspects of religious observance and practice, as well as belief, unless an employer demonstrates that he is unable to responsibly accommodate to an employee's or prospective employee's religious observance or practice without unique hardship to the conduct of the employer's business." This law was enacted to protect employees that are employed by bosses of another religion, and allow them to observe their particular religious practices and celebrations.

See also
Affirmative action
Identity politics
Intersectionality
Reverse discrimination
Social equality
Social justice
Social privilege

References

Further reading
 
 
 

Social inequality
Social justice
Affirmative action